Hemmatabad is a city in Razavi Khorasan Province, Iran

Hemmatabad may also refer to:

Alborz Province
Hemmatabad, Alborz, a village in Nazarabad County, Alborz Province, Iran

Fars Province
Hemmatabad, Pasargad, a village in Pasargad County
Hemmatabad, Shiraz, a village in Shiraz County

Golestan Province
Hemmatabad-e Sistaniha, a village in Kalaleh County
Hemmatabad, Maraveh Tappeh, a village in Maraveh Tappeh County
Hemmatabad, Ramian, a village in Ramian County

Isfahan Province
Hemmatabad, Ardestan, a village in Ardestan County
Hemmatabad, Najafabad, a village in Najafabad County

Kerman Province
Hemmatabad, Bam, a village in Bam County
Hemmatabad-e Olya, Kerman, a village in Kerman County
Hemmatabad-e Sofla, a village in Kerman County
Hemmatabad, Kuhbanan, a village in Kuhbanan County
Hemmatabad, Rud Ab, a village in Narmashir County
Hemmatabad, Rafsanjan, a village in Rafsanjan County
Hemmatabad-e Agah, a village in Rafsanjan County
Hemmatabad-e Olya, Rafsanjan, a village in Rafsanjan County
Hemmatabad-e Chah-e Malek, a village in Rigan County
Hemmatabad-e Gol Mohammad, a village in Rigan County
Hemmatabad-e Vahab, a village in Rigan County
Hemmatabad-e Chah Zahra-ye Bala, a village in Sirjan County
Hemmatabad, Zarand, a village in Zarand County

Kermanshah Province
Hemmatabad, Kermanshah, a village in Sahneh County

Lorestan Province
Hemmatabad, Borujerd, a village in Borujerd County, Lorestan Province, Iran
Hemmatabad, Delfan, a village in Delfan County, Lorestan Province, Iran
Hemmatabad Rural District, an administrative subdivision of Lorestan Province

Mazandaran Province
Hemmatabad, Amol, a village in Amol County
Hemmatabad, Sari, a village in Sari County
Hemmatabad, Tonekabon, a village in Tonekabon County

Qazvin Province
Hemmatabad, Qazvin, a village in Qazvin Province, Iran

Qom Province
Hemmatabad, Qom, a village in Qom Province, Iran

Razavi Khorasan Province
Hemmatabad, a city in Firuzeh County
Hemmatabad, Bakharz, a village in Bakharz County
Hemmatabad-e Zamani, a village in Firuzeh County
Hemmatabad, Mahvelat, a village in Mahvelat County
Hemmatabad, Kenevist, a village in Mashhad County
Hemmatabad, Tabadkan, a village in Mashhad County
Hemmatabad (Qaleh Masharaf), Tabadkan, a village in Mashhad County
Hemmatabad-e Chalaki, a village in Quchan County
Hemmatabad, Torbat-e Jam, a village in Torbat-e Jam County

Semnan Province
Hemmatabad, Semnan, a village in Meyami County, Semnan Province

Sistan and Baluchestan Province
Hemmatabad, Sistan and Baluchestan, a village in Sistan and Baluchestan Province, Iran

South Khorasan Province
Hemmatabad, Khusf, a village in Khusf County
Hemmatabad, Sarbisheh, a village in Sarbisheh County
Hemmatabad, Tabas, a village in Tabas County
Hemmatabad, Dastgerdan, a village in Tabas County
Hemmatabad, Zirkuh, a village in Zirkuh County

West Azerbaijan
Hemmatabad, West Azerbaijan, a village in Salmas County

Yazd Province
Hemmatabad, Ardakan, a village in Ardakan County
Hemmatabad, Saduq, a village in Saduq County
Hemmatabad, Nasrabad, a village in Taft County